Efts or EFTS can refer to:

Eft, the terrestrial juvenile of a newt (a type of salamander)
Electronic funds transfers (EFTs), used in banking industry to transfer money
Effective Full Time Student or Equivalent Full-Time Study (EFTS)
Elementary Flying Training School, a type of Royal Air Force school
Elongation Factor Thermo stable (EF-Ts), an elongation factor in prokaryotic protein synthesis

See also

EFT (disambiguation), for the singular